The Journal of Bacteriology is a biweekly peer-reviewed scientific journal established in 1916. It is published by the American Society for Microbiology and the editor in chief is George A. O'Toole (Dartmouth College). The journal is delayed open access: content is available for free at the journal's website and at PubMed Central after a six-month embargo. The journal is also hybrid open access allowing authors to pay an article processing fee for their articles to be available for free immediately.

Abstracting and indexing
The journal is abstracted and indexed in:

According to the Journal Citation Reports, the journal has a 2020 impact factor of 3.490.

References

External links

Publications established in 1916
Delayed open access journals
Microbiology journals
Biweekly journals
English-language journals
American Society for Microbiology academic journals